The Cabinet of Sigurður Eggerz was formed 7 March 1922.

Cabinets

Inaugural cabinet

Change (18 April 1923)

See also 

1922 establishments in Iceland
1924 disestablishments in Iceland
Sigurdur Eggerz, Cabinet of
Cabinets established in 1922
Cabinets disestablished in 1924
Progressive Party (Iceland)